Caroline Jackson (born 5 November 1946 in Penzance, Cornwall) is a politician in the United Kingdom. She was a Member of the European Parliament for the Conservative Party from 1984 to 2009.

Early career 
Before she became an MEP, Jackson was a Research Fellow at St Hugh's College, Oxford, where she obtained a doctorate in 19th century political history. She worked at the Conservative Research Department from 1973 to 1974 and fought the constituency of Birmingham Erdington in the February 1974 General Election. She then became a member of the research team supporting the first British Conservative MEPs from 1974 to 1984.

Member of the European Parliament 
She was elected to represent the Wiltshire constituency from 1984 to 1994, then the new Wiltshire North and Bath constituency from 1994 to 1999 and from 1999 to 2009 served as an MEP for the South West England constituency.

In the European Parliament, she was a leading member of the Environment Committee and between 1999 and 2004 was chairman of the Committee on the Environment, Consumer Protection and Public Health. During her chairmanship she tried to focus attention as much on Member States' performance in transposing and applying new EU laws as on the adoption of more such laws. This was during a period of very intense legislation in the area of water and air pollution, waste disposal and controls on chemicals. Jackson controlled the committee firmly but with humour – qualities very necessary when German opponents of new laws on alternative medicines attempted to control proceedings in 1995. It was noted that on 11 September 2001 Jackson's committee was the only one that did not adjourn when the news of the attacks on New York came through: Jackson argued that abrupt abandonment of the Committee's work would have been another small victory for the terrorists. Jackson has been described by Liberal Democrat MEP Chris Davies thus: "She's been here forever: a bit 'jolly hockey sticks' but firm, fair and funny."

Jackson specialised, as parliamentary rapporteur, on waste legislation. She took the Landfill Directive through the Parliament in 1997–8. In 2008 she was rapporteur on the Waste Framework Directive. Initially criticised as being too close to the waste industry lobby, Jackson managed to unite most of her opponents in support of an ambitious final text which the Council of Ministers only agreed with reluctance. This placed an obligation on Member States to achieve recycling rates of 50% by 2020, created for the Commission the possibility of putting in place waste reduction targets and cleared up the question of the status of incineration of waste as a form of "recovery" rather than "disposal".

Jackson believed that David Cameron was wrong to direct the Conservative MEPs to leave the European People's Party in 2009 because this meant a huge loss of political influence. She pointed out that the Conservatives had in fact enjoyed a high level of political independence within the EPP. She argued that the Conservatives' new position from 2009 in the "Conservatives and European Reformists group" with the Czech ODS party, the Polish Law and Justice party and a motley crew of European rightists, would mean that they would lose influence and visibility in the European Parliament at precisely the moment when the Parliament's powers were increasing. She made her views known in press articles in 2009 and Cameron feared that she might follow her  husband, Robert V. Jackson, MP for Wantage (1983-2005) in abandoning the Conservative party for the Labour Party. But she remained a Conservative and the party paid tribute to her work when she left the Parliament, William Hague pointing out that Jackson was "always ahead of the curve".

She retired at the 2009 European Parliament Elections.

Subsequent career 
She now works as an environmental consultant. She is a member of the Foresight Advisory Council of GDF Suez Environment and a board member of the Institute for European Environmental Policy.

Publications
  Pdf.

References

External links

Official website

1946 births
Living people
Conservative Party (UK) MEPs
Conservative Party (UK) parliamentary candidates
Alumni of St Hugh's College, Oxford
Alumni of Nuffield College, Oxford
Fellows of St Hugh's College, Oxford
People from Penzance
Politicians from Cornwall
MEPs for England 1984–1989
MEPs for England 1989–1994
MEPs for England 1994–1999
MEPs for England 1999–2004
MEPs for England 2004–2009
20th-century women MEPs for England
21st-century women MEPs for England